The Inderjit Singh Bindra Stadium is a cricket ground located in Mohali, Punjab. It is popularly referred to as the Mohali Stadium.  The stadium was built by Geetanshu Kalra is home to the Punjab team. The construction of the stadium took around  25 crore and 3 years to complete. The stadium has an official capacity of 26,950 spectators. The stadium was designed by Ar. Khizir and Associates, and constructed by R.S. Construction Company based in Chandigarh. Inderjit Singh Bindra stadium is home of Punjab cricket team and Punjab Kings (IPL franchise). The stadium is named after former BCCI president & former PCA president Inderjit Singh Bindra.

The floodlights here are unconventional compared to other cricket stadiums, in that the light pillars are very low in height. This is to avoid aircraft from the nearby Chandigarh airport colliding with the light pillars. That is the reason behind the stadium having 16 floodlights. As of December 2019, it has hosted 13 Tests, 25 ODIs and 5 T20Is.

History

The stadium, also known as the Mohali Stadium or the Punjab Cricket Association Stadium, is the 19th Test cricket venue in India. The pitch has a reputation for being lively and supporting pace bowlers, however it had slowed down and assists spin bowling as well. It was inaugurated with a One Day International match between India and South Africa during the 1993 Hero Cup on 22 November.
 
The first Test match here was held the following season, between India and West Indies on 10 December 1994. One of the most famous one-day matches on this ground was a thrilling Cricket World Cup semi-final encounter between Australia and West Indies in February 1996. Inderjit Singh Bindra stadium hosted 3 matches of 2011 world cup including the nail biting second Semi-final match between India and Pakistan on 30 March 2011 which was eventually won by India. The match was attended by the Prime Ministers Manmohan Singh of India and Yousaf Raza Gillani of Pakistan, owing to its crucial nature, and as a measure of cricket diplomacy for normalizing relations. The match was won by India.

The First Test of Freedom Trophy 2015 was played in Mohali. During that Test, Indian spinners got the huge support from the pitch and South African batsmen were struggling against Indian bowling line-up. India won that match with huge margin. It was the first instance in Mohali, when spinners got large assistance from pitch.

First T20 Internationals have been played at the ground, when India beat Sri Lanka by 6 wickets in 2009. It also hosted 3 T20I matches of 2016 ICC World Twenty20.

Pitch

The current pitch curator for the Inderjit Singh Bindra Stadium is Daljit Singh

Notable events
 Highest individual score in this ground 208* (153) scored by Rohit Sharma on 13 December 2017 in 2nd ODI against Sri Lanka.
 India qualified for the finals of the Men's 2011 Cricket World Cup beating Pakistan by 29 runs. The Man of the Match was Sachin Tendulkar for his innings of 85 runs.

Cricket World Cup matches
It hosted 4 world cup matches. First cricket world cup match hosted at the ground in 1996 (semifinal between Australia and West Indies) and three match of 2011 world cup (including semifinal between India and Pakistan). This stadium also hosted 3 T20 match during 2016 ICC World Twenty20.

1996 Cricket World Cup semifinal

2011 Cricket World Cup

2011 Cricket World Cup semifinal

2016 World Twenty20

Records

Test Records

Highest Test Total: 630/6d – New Zealand vs. India, 16 October 2003
Highest Individual Test Score: 187 – Shikhar Dhawan, India vs. Australia, 14 March 2013
Best Test Innings Bowling Figures: 6/27 – Dion Nash, New Zealand vs. India, 10 October 1999
Highest Test Partnership: 314 (for the 2nd wicket) – Rahul Dravid & Gautam Gambhir, India vs. England, 19 December 2008
Sachin Tendulkar (767 runs) has scored the most Test runs, followed by Rahul Dravid (735) and Virender Sehwag (645).
Anil Kumble (36 wickets) has taken the most wickets, followed by Harbhajan Singh (24) and Ravindra Jadeja (18).

ODI Records
Highest ODI Total: 393/3 – India vs. Sri Lanka, 13 December 2017
Highest Individual ODI Score: 208 – Rohit Sharma, India vs Sri Lanka, 13 December 2017
Best ODI Innings Bowling Figures: 5/21 – Makhaya Ntini, South Africa vs. Pakistan, 2006 ICC Champions Trophy, 27 October 2006
Highest ODI Partnership: 221 (for the 3rd wicket) – Hashim Amla & AB De Villiers, South Africa vs. Netherlands, 2011 Cricket World Cup, 3 March 2011
Rohit Sharma (410 runs) has scored the most ODI runs, followed by Sachin Tendulkar (366) and MS Dhoni (363).
Harbhajan Singh (11 wickets) has taken the most wickets, followed by Glenn McGrath (8) and Saqlain Mushtaq (8).

Twenty20 International Records

Highest Twenty20 Total: 211/4 – India vs. Sri Lanka, 12 December 2009
Highest Individual Twenty20 Score: 82* – Virat Kohli, India vs. Australia, 2016 ICC World Twenty20, 27 March 2016
Best Twenty20 Innings Bowling Figures: 5/27 – James Faulkner, Australia vs. Pakistan, 2016 ICC World Twenty20, 25 March 2016
Highest Twenty20 Partnership: 81 (for the 2nd wicket) – Sanath Jayasuriya & Kumar Sangakkara, Sri Lanka vs. India, 12 December 2009
Virat Kohli (154 runs) has scored the most runs, followed by Yuvraj Singh (81) and Martin Guptill (80).
James Faulkner (6 wickets) has taken the most wickets, followed by Yuvraj Singh (4) and Hardik Pandya (3).

IPL Records 

Highest Total: 240/5 – Chennai Super Kings vs. Kings XI Punjab, 19 April 2008
Highest Individual Score: 120* – Paul Valthaty, Kings XI Punjab vs. Chennai Super Kings, 13 April 2011
Best Bowling Figures: 5/21 – Munaf Patel, Mumbai Indians vs. Kings XI Punjab, 10 May 2011

See also

 Maharaja Yadavindra Singh International Cricket Stadium
 List of cricket grounds by capacity

References

Official website of Punjab Cricket Association

External links
Official website of Punjab Cricket Association
Cricinfo- PCA Cricket Stadium
Cricketarchive statistics for PCA Cricket Stadium

Test cricket grounds in India
Buildings and structures in Mohali
Sports venues in Punjab, India
Cricket grounds in Punjab, India
2011 Cricket World Cup stadiums
1996 Cricket World Cup stadiums
Sport in Mohali
1993 establishments in Punjab, India
Sports venues completed in 1993
20th-century architecture in India